George Dewsnip is an English retired professional footballer who played in the Football League, North American Soccer League, American Soccer League and Major Indoor Soccer League.

He became an apprentice in 1972 and later signed professional terms with Preston North End but was released in 1974 without making a first team appearance. He then joined nearby Southport.

In June 1977, Southport sold Dewsnip's contract to the Fort Lauderdale Strikers of the North American Soccer League for £11,000. In June 1978, the Strikers sent Dewsnip, Andy Rolland and the number one selection in the 1980 NASL Draft to the Los Angeles Aztecs in exchange for George Best. He spent a season and a half in Los Angeles before being sent to the Atlanta Chiefs. He finished the 1979 season in Atlanta, then played for the Columbus Magic of the American Soccer League in 1980. That fall, he signed with the Cleveland Force of the Major Indoor Soccer League.

References

External links
NASL stats

1956 births
Living people
American Soccer League (1933–1983) players
Association football wingers
Atlanta Chiefs players
Columbus Magic players
Cleveland Force (original MISL) players
English footballers
English expatriate footballers
English Football League players
Fort Lauderdale Strikers (1977–1983) players
Los Angeles Aztecs players
Major Indoor Soccer League (1978–1992) players
New Jersey Rockets (MISL) players
North American Soccer League (1968–1984) players
People from Salford
Southport F.C. players
English expatriate sportspeople in the United States
Expatriate soccer players in the United States
Preston North End F.C. players